The CSR Qishuyan SDA2 is a diesel-electric locomotive manufactured by CSR Qishuyan Locomotive Co, in association with MTU Friedrichshafen for use in Australia.

History
In 2013, Pacific National ordered five narrow gauge versions of the CSR Ziyang SDA1 locomotives. Classified as the SDA2 class, they were purchased for use on the  network in Queensland.

All had been delivered by September 2014 and were undergoing trials on the Goonyella Coalfields being based at Nebo. They entered service in February 2015.

The nickname "Dragon" derived from a proposed livery having a golden dragon on the hoods of the locomotives.

In 2017 Pacific National won the contract to haul raw sugar to the Port of Townsville for export by Wilmar's Burdekin Sugar mills and the haulage of Proserpine mills product to the Port of Mackay. In the first year, 83 Class locomotives (GT42CU ACe) hauled electronically controlled pneumatic brakes fitted RGWY tandem hopper wagons and (upon request by the sugar mill) RNWY container flats with ex Aurizon AMLU molasses tank containers. Ironically the slogan wrapped on one of the lead or slave wagons "Supporting Queensland Industry" contradicts itself, the PN sugar fleet was manufactured in China. Due to the increased demand of locomotives required by PN, rumours spread of the spasmodically-used 88 Class being sent to Townsville to haul 3 sets of RGWY hoppers for the Burdekin Sugar Mills. On  23 March 2019, 8804 arrived at PNs Toll North depot in vehicle on 82P9; Moolabin to Townsville Intermodal. The remainder of the class arrived at later dates and work commenced to ready them for testing by the 2019 crush. On the 28 July 2019, 8805 was the first locomotive to pass preliminary testing and was trialled on service 8Q84. Trialling continued on all members of the class with issues concerning communication between the locomotives and telemetry systems for loading and unloading of wagons. Toward the end of August it was expected an 88 class would usually lead a raw sugar train.

After the 2019 sugar season ended, Pacific National began trialling the fleet in their Intermodal Division, having 15 locomotives rostered with little to none to spare. Initially being downgraded to shunting duties in the Townsville region and later Gladstone. Townsville saw the fleet being used on the Toll North to the Port of Townsville cement shunts, often double heading. On one occasion an 88 lead 8CP1 from Townsville to Cairns. With minimal locomotive diversity in the Pacific National fleet, crews did not favour the locomotives over GT42s. Resulting in four units being stored in Toll North, except for one unit that operated as a shunting loco in Gladstone, awaiting the start of the next sugar season.

The 2020 season saw the class start what they left off the previous year, this time operating test sugar trains for the Burdekin mills that commenced on 5 June 2020 prior to the start of the crush. Respectively Inkerman Mill in Home Hill on 8 June 2020 and the remainder on 9 June 2020.

Summary

References

Diesel locomotives of Queensland
Pacific National diesel locomotives
Railway locomotives introduced in 2014
3 ft 6 in gauge locomotives of Australia
Diesel-electric locomotives of Australia